St. Albans General Store, also known as Head's Store, is a historic commercial building located at St. Albans, Franklin County, Missouri. It was built in 1892, and is a two-story frame building with a large one-story ell.  It features a one-story, wrap-around porch.  The main block has a steeply-pitched truncated hip roof. Also on the property is a contributing blacksmith shop constructed in the 1920s.  It is a significant example of a rural general store and residence.

It was listed on the National Register of Historic Places in 2003.

Origins 
The store was built by a group of 10 area residents.  Each resident contributed 60 dollars to finance the store.  The details of the agreement were documented in the "Day Book of the St. Albans Store Building" which was kept by Charles Becker, the first director and treasurer
for the store company

References

Commercial buildings on the National Register of Historic Places in Missouri
Commercial buildings completed in 1892
Buildings and structures in Franklin County, Missouri
National Register of Historic Places in Franklin County, Missouri